Captain Ryoko Azuma (東 良子) (born December 10, 1973) is the first woman to become the chief of a warship unit in the Japan Maritime Self-Defense Force. She was also a member of the first female class at the National Defense Academy of Japan.

Career 
After graduating from high school, Azuma entered the National Defense Academy of Japan in 1992, where she was one of the first women to enter the academy. In March 1996, she entered the Japan Maritime Self-Defense Force. Alongside Miho Otani, she was the first woman to become the captain of a training ship. In 2014 Azuma became the first female captain to conduct a deep sea navigation training. On January 1, 2015, she was official promoted to the rank of colonel. On March 23, 2016, she transferred to the Maritime Staff Office.

The squadron is made up of four warships and the helicopter carrier . On August 5, 2018, she took command of a mission to deal with the pirates in the Gulf of Aden in Somalia.

See also 

 Misa Matsushima – First woman in the Japanese Self-Defense Force to become a fighter pilot

References 

Living people
1973 births
National Defense Academy of Japan alumni
People from Ishikawa Prefecture
Japan Maritime Self-Defense Force personnel